The men's football tournament at the 2019 Southeast Asian Games was held from 25 November to 10 December 2019 in the Philippines. All eleven Southeast Asian nations participated in the men's tournament. Matches were played in Manila, Biñan and Imus. Men's teams were restricted to under-22 players (born on or after 1 January 1997).

Thailand were the defending champions but were eliminated in the group stage. Vietnam won their first title as unified country, having won the gold medal in 1959 previously as South Vietnam.

Competition schedule
The following was the competition schedule for the men's football competitions:

Venues
The matches were played across three venues. The renovated Rizal Memorial Stadium in Manila was the primary venue, while some matches in the group stage were held at the Biñan Football Stadium in Biñan, Laguna and the City of Imus Grandstand in Imus, Cavite.

Squads

The men's tournament was an under-22 international tournament (born on or after 1 January 1997), with a maximum of two overage players allowed. Each participating nation's squad were composed of maximum of 20 players.

Summary
The men's tournament began with Malaysia meeting Myanmar. Soe Moe Kyaw's goal opened the scoring, later Hadi from Malaysia equalized. From there, the match would end as a draw, temporarily putting both teams on the top of the table. Also, Vietnam defeated Brunei 6–0 to start their campaign on a high, while Philippines held Cambodia to a shock draw, title holders Thailand suffered a shock defeat against Indonesia. Both Laos and Singapore were held by a goalless draw. Vietnam scored another six goals, but conceded one against Laos, with a dominant 6–1 victory. Myanmar edged past hosts Philippines thanks to a late goal by Win Naing Tun. Brunei also lost 7–0 to Thailand, conceding 13 in 2 games. Cambodia would ease past Timor-Leste, while Indonesia defeated Singapore 2–0. Goals from Aung Kaung Mann, Htet Phyo Wai and Hlaing Bo Bo, Myanmar earned a 3–1 win, with 7 points in three games. While Thailand and Laos earned wins over Singapore and Brunei respectively, Philippines defeated Malaysia 1–0, which was considered a shock, while Vietnam earned a late goal from Nguyễn Hoàng Đức put them on the top of the table. While Malaysia got their first win, the first team qualified to the knockout stage was Myanmar. A very late 86 minute goal by Aung Kaung Mann put him on 3 goals in 4 games. Thailand scored two late goals against Laos to potentially eliminate them, while Indonesia battered Brunei 8–0. Vietnam would get lucky with a late goal yet again, while Hà Đức Chinh scored a late winner against Singapore, putting them in the next round. The loss for Singapore meant that they were yet to score a goal. Cambodia earned a shock win against Malaysia, who earned only 4 points. Philippines defeated Timor-Leste, but nonetheless, they went out on goal difference. Singapore would get their first goals, all coming against Brunei. Indonesia would also beat Laos 4–0, while Vietnam were held by Thailand with two early goals by Supachai Chaided and Suphanat Mueanta. Myanmar, Indonesia, Vietnam and Cambodia earned spots in the semi-finals, while holders Thailand and runners-up of 2017 tournament Malaysia were eliminated early. Hosts Philippines showed signs of impressiveness, only failing to go past Cambodia by goal difference.

The first semi-final saw Indonesia win 4-2 after extra time against Myanmar, with Evan Dimas scoring a brace. Despite this, the bronze medal was still likely to be in Myanmar's hands. Hà Đức Chinh scored a hat-trick against Cambodia, while Nguyễn Tiến Linh scored one to earn Vietnam a final spot against Indonesia.

In the bronze medal match, Sieng Chanthea scored a shock early goal. But eight minutes later, Aung Kaung Mann scored his fifth goal of the tournament. Myat Kaung Khant scored in the 35th minute, but Keo Sokpheng scored in the 71st minute. The match went goalless for the final parts of regular time, and extra time. All of Myanmar's 5 penalty takers scored, while Keo Sokpheng's penalty hit the post, Myanmar won bronze, their first medal since 2015, when they failed to beat Thailand in the final. In the gold medal match, midfielder Đỗ Hùng Dũng scored a goal while 20-year old Đoàn Văn Hậu scored a brace, giving Vietnam their first gold medal as a unified country. They managed to retain their status as a gold medallist and won the 2021 tournament.

Draw
The draw was held on 15 October 2019 at Sofitel Hotel in Manila, Philippines. The 11 teams in the men's tournament were drawn into two groups of five and six teams. Four pots will be used for the draw with teams seeded according to their previous performance in the 2017 Southeast Asian Games. Defending champions Thailand and hosts Philippines are seeded in Pot 1.

The Vietnam Football Federation filed a complaint regarding the seeding of the Vietnam national team in Pot 4 for the men's football tournament questioning the fact that their national team, who collected ten points in the group stage of the 2017 edition of the games, was seeded lower than the two teams who collected less points and were seeded Pot 3 (Myanmar with nine points and Singapore with six points). Vietnam was later elevated to Pot 3 and Singapore was relegated to Pot 4.

Officials

Referees
 Ismaeel Habib Ali (Bahrain)
 Chen Hsin-chuan (Chinese Taipei)
 C. R. Srikrishna (India)
 Yousif Hassan (Iraq)
 Ammar Ashkanani (Kuwait)
 Khash-Erdene Bold (Mongolia)
 Khaled Al-Shaqsi (Oman)
 Clifford Daypuyat (Philippines)
 Linjun Talaver (Philippines)
 Steve Supresencia (Philippines)
 Salman Falahi (Qatar)
 Majed Al-Shamrani (Saudi Arabia)
 Feras Taweel (Syria)

Assistant Referees
 Sayed Al-Alawi (Bahrain)
 Chen Hsiao-en (Chinese Taipei)
 So Kai Man (Hong Kong)
 Sumanta Dutta (India)
 Abdulhadi Alanezi (Kuwait)
 Nasser Ambusaidi (Oman)
 Francis Engalgado (Philippines)
 Kent Gobuyan (Philippines)
 Giovanni Lachica (Philippines)
 Krizmark Nañola (Philippines)
 Zahy Al-Shammari (Qatar)
 Yassir Al-Sultan (Saudi Arabia)
 Rami Taan (Syria)

Group stage 
All times are Philippine Standard Time (UTC+8).

Group A

Group B

Knockout stage

Semi-finals

Bronze medal match

Gold medal match

Winners

Goalscorers

Notes

Final ranking

See also
2019 SEA Games Women's Football tournament

References

External links
  

Men's tournament